Ján Gerthofer (27 May 1910 – 9 August 1991) was the third-highest scoring fighter ace from Slovakia during World War II. He accumulated 26 kills.

Gerthofer had joined the Czechoslovak Air Force in 1927 flying bombers. In 1939, he became a pilot in the Air Force of newly independent Slovakia. After completing training on Messerschmitt Bf 109 fighter aircraft in October 1942, he was appointed deputy commanding officer of 13 JG 52, the Slovak air contingent on the Eastern Front. In 175 sorties he shot down 26 Soviet aircraft.

In the Slovak National Uprising in August 1944, Gerthofer joined the insurgents, but was taken prisoner on 31 August and spent the rest of the war in Stalag XVIII-A.

After the war, Gerthofer served in the re–formed Czechoslovak Air Force before being discharged for political reasons in 1951.

References

Bibliography

1910 births
1991 deaths
People from Malacky District
Czechoslovak military personnel
Slovak military personnel of World War II
World War II flying aces
World War II prisoners of war held by Germany
Recipients of the Iron Cross (1939), 1st class